The Via Ostiensis was an important road in ancient Rome. It ran west  from the city of Rome to its important sea port of Ostia Antica, from which it took its name. The road began near the Forum Boarium, ran between the Aventine Hill and the Tiber River along its left (eastern) bank, and left the city's Servian Walls through the Porta Trigemina. When the later Aurelian Walls were built, the road left the city through the Porta Ostiensis (Porta San Paolo). In the late Roman Empire, trade suffered under an economic crisis, and Ostia declined as an important port. With the accompanying growth of importance of the Via Portuensis from the time of Constantine onwards, that of the Via Ostiensis correspondingly decreased. Modern Via Ostiense, following a similar path, is the main connection of Rome to Ostia (one of the quarters of Rome at present) together with the Via del Mare. On its way to Ostia, the road passes by the important basilica of Saint Paul Outside the Walls.

Roman bridges 

There are the remains of at least one Roman bridge along the road, which is the Ponte presso Tor di Valle.

See also 
 Roman road
 Roman bridge
 Roman engineering
 Ostiense

External links
LacusCurtius — Via Ostiensis

Ostiensis, Via
Ostiensis
Ostia (Rome)
Rome Q. XXXII Europa
Rome Q. X Ostiense
Rome Q. XXXIV Lido di Ostia Levante